Vrisera (romanized: Vryserá/Vriserá) is a village in Gjirokastër County, southern Albania. At the 2015 local government reform it became part of the municipality of Dropull. It is inhabited solely by Greeks.

Demographics 
According to Ottoman statistics, the village had 396 inhabitants in 1895. The village had 311 inhabitants in 1993, all ethnically Greeks.

References

External links 
Vrisera dance, 2016

Villages in Gjirokastër County
Greek communities in Albania